Gusserane O'Rahilly's club is a Gaelic Athletic Association club located in Ballycullane, County Wexford, Ireland. The club fields teams in both hurling and Gaelic football in Wexford GAA competitions.

The club is one of a number that use the "O'Rahilly's" name (after Michael Rahilly from County Kerry), with others existing in places such as Drogheda, Monaghan and Tralee.

Liam Fardy, who managed the Wexford senior football team between 1991 and 1995, and who also manged the county's under-21 football team, is from Gusserane.

The club won a first Wexford Senior Football Championship title for 41 years in 2016.

It contested the 2021 Wexford SFC final but lost.

Honours
 Wexford Senior Football Championships (6):  1945, 1946, 1947, 1954, 1975, 2016
 Wexford Intermediate Football Championship (1):  1997
 Wexford Intermediate A Hurling Championship (1): 2020
 Wexford Junior Hurling Championship (1): 2017
 Wexford Junior Football Championships (4): 1926, 1944, 1965, 2017
 Wexford Under-21 Football Championships (4): 1969, 1970, 1977, 1983 (all with Clongeen)
 Wexford Minor Football Championships (4): 1943, 1944, 1945, 1963

References

External links

Gaelic games clubs in County Wexford
Hurling clubs in County Wexford
Gaelic football clubs in County Wexford